The Netherlands women's national ice hockey team represents the Netherlands in international ice hockey competition, including the International Ice Hockey Federation's (IIHF) Women's World Championship. The women's national team is overseen by Netherlands Ice Hockey Association. In February 2011, the Netherlands were promoted to Division II of the IIHF World Women's Championship. The Netherlands had 362 female ice hockey players registered with the IIHF in 2022, over double the 175 players on record in 2011.

Tournament record

Olympic Games

The women's team of Netherlands has never qualified for an Olympic tournament.

World Championship
1999 – Finished in 16th place (8th in Group B)
2000 – Finished in 21st place
2001 – Finished in 18th place
2003 – Finished in 19th place (5th in Division II)
2004 – Finished in 19th place (4th in Division II)
2005 – Finished in 20th place (6th in Division II)
2007 – Finished in 20th place (5th in Division II)
2008 – Finished in 20th place (5th in Division II)
2009 – Finished in 21st place (6th in Division II, Relegated to Division III)
2011 – Finished in 20th place (1st in Division III, Promoted to Division II)
2012 – Finished in 19th place (5th in Division IB)
2013 – Finished in 16th place (2nd in Division IB)
2014 – Finished in 18th place (4th in Division IB)
2015 – Finished in 16th place (2nd in Division IB)
2016 – Finished in 20th place (6th in Division IB, Relegated to Division IIA)
2017 – Finished in 22nd place (2nd in Division IIA)
2018 – Finished in 22nd place (1st in Division IIA, Promoted to Division IB)
2019 – Finished in 17th place (1st in Division IB, Promoted to Division IA)
2020 – Cancelled due to the COVID-19 pandemic
2021 – Cancelled due to the COVID-19 pandemic
2022 – Finished in 15th place (5th in Division IA)

European Championship
1989 – Finished in 8th place
1991 – Finished in 10th place
1995 – Finished 6th in Group B
1996 – Finished 6th in Group B

Elite Women's Hockey League
Since the season 2010–11, the Netherlands women's national team participates in the Elite Women's Hockey League.

Team

2022 roster
Roster for the 2022 IIHF Women's World Championship Division I Group A. Player age on first day of tournament, 24 April 2022.

Head coach: Marco KronenburgAssistant coaches: Josh Mizerek, Jenn Wakefield

References

External links

IIHF profile

 
Ice hockey
Women's national ice hockey teams in Europe
1987 establishments in the Netherlands
European Women's Hockey League teams